Mircești is a commune in Iași County, Western Moldavia, Romania. It is composed of two villages, Iugani and Mircești. It also included the villages of Izvoarele, Răchiteni and Ursărești until 2004, when these were split off to form Răchiteni Commune.

Notable people
 
 
Vladimir Petercă (1944–2022), Roman Catholic theologian

References

Communes in Iași County
Localities in Western Moldavia